God Bless the Red Krayola and All Who Sail With It is the second commercially released studio album by the American avant rock band Red Krayola. It was released in May 1968 by the independent record label known as International Artists.

Background

In 1968, the band received a cease & desist letter from the Binney & Smith company, the manufacturers of Crayola crayons; in compliance they changed their name from "Red Crayola" to "Red Krayola" - this left them with two different names for all their commercially released 1960s studio albums. Mayo Thompson said "When we signed with International Artists, we scared them to death, 'cause we said 'We want to change our name on every record!' And they were like, 'Oh, no. After the Red Krayola's performance at the Berkeley Folk Festival the band recorded tapes with folk guitarist John Fahey, which record label International Artists demanded they have given to them. Mayo Thompson later felt at "loose ends" and decided to go on a trip to Los Angeles, where he met and worked with Joseph Byrd of The United States of America as well as running into Nico who had just left the Velvet Underground looking for musicians for her next solo album, Thompson did not work with her as he said "she was not interested in what I was doing."
 At this time, Frederick Barthelme left the band to pursue writing and conceptual art in New York (working for a brief period at the Kornblee Gallery) and was replaced by Tommy Smith.

Recording 
The album was recorded in one month, mostly on four-track; there was no use of artificial reverb on the record until the very last track "Night Song". Thompson spoke of the process in an interview with TapeOp in 2000: "It took us about a month to make that—we had a little time to make that. Engineer was Jim Duff." Thompson said his label wanted another album, "but they wanted to know what the songs were, and I didn't want to tell them everything. So I played some tunes for them. Went in and made a demo" at the Houston studio owned by Walt Andrus.

On producing the record Mayo Thompson remarked "I’m credited on God Bless The Red Krayola and All Who Sail With It [1968]. I played a role and so did Steve but we weren’t the producers. It was Jim Duff."

Thompson also talked about recording at Gold Star: "That was a real recording studio in the grand style. It was modeled on Gold Star... So it was okay, the gear was a bit primitive... Mostly we recorded 4-track, but when we needed extra tracks we could fly in 3 outboard tracks from submixing stuff... We eschewed all technical embellishment. EQ was all set flat. We recorded flat. No reverb on that record until the very last tune. 'Night Song', it drifts, the reverb is jacked up, very obviously, but before that there is no reverb. All you hear is just the acoustics of the room."

Music 
Mayo Thompson said in an interview with Steve Silverstein of TapeOp how they went about making the songs for the album: "A lot of it was written on the fly, on the feet. Pieces were improvised and made up. Go home at night, and 'I got an idea.' A lot of that stuff is sorted out in the studio, raised in the studio."

Keith Connolly of BOMB magazine would remark in a 2015 interview with Thompson that God Bless sounded like it was predicting bands such as the Minutemen, Unrest, Bastro and Gastr Del Sol to which Thompson replied: "Predicting? I don’t hear it like that. It was made to put paid to musical possibility as I understood it at the time. It represents the end of the game as it stood."

Reception 
The album failed to live up to the commercial success of The Parable of Arable Land: it sold only around 6,000 copies and was dismissed by most critics. The Chicago Seed reviewed it on July 7, 1968. They compared the record to their debut and disliked the change in direction:

The band fell out with International Artists and as demands grew for Tommy Smith elsewhere, there was no question of playing the songs live as intended; therefore they disbanded. Steve Cunningham would move to Vienna in 1969 to study linguistics. He studied an M.A in German language and began work as a technical writer, a profession that he's still currently in.

Mark Deming of AllMusic wrote: "God Bless the Red Krayola and All Who Sail With It bears precious little resemblance to anything else that appeared at the time; it would take a few decades of post-punk experimentalism before Mayo Thompson's vision would have a truly suitable context, though the album's playful undercurrent goes a long way toward making these tiny shards of sound go down easily for the musically open-minded."  The Spin Alternative Record Guide called the album "superb", describing it as "small songs full of quiet terror and acoustic confusion".

Dave Marsh wrote on the 1983 Rolling Stone record guide: "As a psychedelic novelty (from Texas yet), the Crayola was a late-Sixties amusement – the only band in the world ever to record a motorcycle live in the studio. That was on the inaugural disc, Parable. With God Bless, the joke had already worn thin, but after Radar reissued the first two albums in England, a band of arty post-punk minimalists attempted to carry the tradition onward, with particularly insipid results".
 

Pitchfork's Alex Lindhart wrote "For all the laudations heaped upon the Krayola by the punk and post-punk crowds, it might as well be bootleg Einstürzende Neubauten at its grimiest atonality and infuritating double integral time signatures: "The Shirt" and "The Jewels of Madonna" are vicious gorges brimming with abrasive wire-cutting, pop-gun propulsion."

Texas Monthly wrote that "...with no song topping 3 minutes. A generation on, [the] album would be a blueprint for punk rock."

Notable fans of the album include Manos Hatzidakis and David Grubbs. 

Alex Lindhart also adds "The Krayola's legacy is surely bolstered by their location in rock history – simply put, this was likely the most experimental band of the 1960s".

Galaxie 500 later covered "Victory Garden" on a 1990 single.

God Bless the Red Krayola and All Who Sail With It was placed number 185 on Uncut magazine's "the 500 Greatest Albums of the 1960s" list.

Track listing

Personnel 
 The Red Krayola

 Steve Cunningham – fretless bass guitar, cover design
 Tommy Smith – drums, cover design
 Mayo Thompson – guitar, piano, vocals, cover design (credited as producer on the vinyl disc as well as the rest of the band on the liner notes but the LP was actually produced by Jim Duff)

 Technical personnel
 Jim Duff – Engineer
 Fred Caroll – Engineer
 Dennis Collins – Engineer

 Additional personnel
 Chorus Singers – Mary Sue, Dotty, Pat Pritchett, Barbara Metyko, Elaine Banks, Carolyn Heinman and Candy
 Holly Pritchett – vocals on "Big"
 Dick Wray – back cover photographer (of Mayo and Steve)
 Guy Clark – back cover photographer (of Tommy Smith)

Release history 

This release includes extensive liner notes, including interviews and photographs

References

External links 
 

1968 albums
International Artists albums
Radar Records albums
Red Krayola albums